Stevenson is a city in the Columbia River Gorge National Scenic Area along the Columbia River in Skamania County, Washington, United States. It is the county seat of Skamania County and home to the Skamania County Court House and Sheriff's Office. The population was 1,465 at the 2010 census, a 22% increase over 2000. 

Stevenson is home to the Columbia Gorge Interpretive Center, which focuses on several tribes that were once located near the Columbia River.

History

Stevenson is named for early settler George H. Stevenson.  The Stevenson family, who settled in the Gorge in the 1800s from Missouri, founded the town of Stevenson on the old Shepard donation land claim. Under the auspices of the Stevenson Land Company, George Stevenson purchased the original townsite for $24,000 in 1893, building the town along the lower flat near the river. Settlers expanded the original dock to serve the daily arrivals of sternwheelers unloading passengers, cargo and loading logs.

In 1893, in a dispute over rental fees, an unknown crew transported the county records from the town of Cascades to Stevenson. Stevenson became the county seat of Skamania overnight. Stevenson was officially incorporated on December 16, 1907. In 1908 the Spokane, Portland & Seattle Railroad arrived, pushing the town up the hill away from the river. Streets were graded, wooden sidewalks constructed and the city asked residents to keep their cows from roaming the streets.

Geography

The city is located on Washington State Route 14 between the city of North Bonneville and Carson.

Demographics

2010 census

At the 2010 census there were 1,465 people in 640 households, including 390 families, in the city. The racial makeup of the city was 93.9% White, 0.6% African American, 1.8% Native American, 0.5% Asian, 0.1% Pacific Islander, 0.5% from other races, and 2.6% from two or more races. Hispanic or Latino of any race were 5.8%.

Of the 640 households, 28.6% had children under the age of 18 living with them, 41.3% were married couples living together, 15.9% had a female householder with no husband present, 3.8% had a male householder with no wife present, and 39.1% were non-families. 33.4% of households were one person and 12.8% were one person aged 65 or older. The average household size was 2.25 and the average family size was 2.86.

The median age was 42.1 years. 23% of residents were under the age of 18; 6.6% were between the ages of 18 and 24; 24.5% were from 25 to 44; 30.6% were from 45 to 64; and 15.3% were 65 or older. The gender makeup of the city was 47.1% male and 52.9% female.

2000 census

As of the census of 2000, there were 1,200 people in 474 households, including 307 families, in the city. The population density was 813.4 people per square mile (313.1/km). There were 523 housing units at an average density of 354.5 per square mile (136.4/km). The racial makeup of the city was 91.92% White, 0.17% African American, 2.42% Native American, 0.58% Asian, 1.75% from other races, and 3.17% from two or more races. Hispanic or Latino of any race were 5.33% of the population.

Of the 474 households, 31.6% had children under the age of 18 living with them, 46.2% were married couples living together, 14.6% had a female householder with no husband present, and 35.2% were non-families. 29.5% of households were one person and 10.1% were one person aged 65 or older. The average household size was 2.41 and the average family size was 2.95.

In the city, the age distribution of the population shows 25.1% under the age of 18, 9.8% from 18 to 24, 25.8% from 25 to 44, 25.5% from 45 to 64, and 13.9% 65 or older. The median age was 39 years. For every 100 females, there were 91.1 males. For every 100 females age 18 and over, there were 87.7 males.

The median household income was $31,979 and the median family income was $38,750. Males had a median income of $36,042 versus $25,893 for females. The per capita income for the city was $15,602. About 17.8% of families and 22.8% of the population were below the poverty line, including 30.2% of those under age 18 and 17.0% of those age 65 or over.

Parks and recreation
Stevenson is situated within the Columbia River Gorge National Scenic Area, which contains the highland terrain areas of Greenleaf Peak and Table Mountain. Hikers can access the Pacific Crest Trail south of the community.

The Bridge of the Gods is south of Stevenson.

See also

 List of cities in Washington
 Skamania Lodge

References

External links

 City of Stevenson Website
 

Cities in Washington (state)
Cities in Skamania County, Washington
County seats in Washington (state)
Columbia River Gorge
Washington (state) populated places on the Columbia River